The Nevada State Democratic Party (NSDP) is the affiliate of the Democratic Party in the U.S. state of Nevada. It has been chaired by Daniele Monroe-Moreno since March 2023. It is currently the state's favored party, controlling all but one of Nevada's four U.S. House seats, both U.S. Senate seats, and both houses of the state legislature. The only statewide offices that the party does not control are the governorship, lieutenant governorship, and controllership, which are currently held by Republicans Joe Lombardo, Stavros Anthony, and Andy Matthews, respectively.

History
The state of Nevada has had 22 political parties over the years. Only six of these parties lasted up until the 2004 elections. The Democratic Party and the Republican Party remain as the top two in the state.

With the help of Abraham Lincoln in 1864, Nevada became the 36th state in America. Lincoln's Republican influence was considerable among the Nevada state citizens during his presidency. The first two general elections in Nevada, held in 1864 and 1867, were dominated by the Republican Party. In 1871, the Democratic Party started to gain momentum and won four of the six constitutional offices: governor, lieutenant governor, state treasurer and attorney general.

Towards the beginning of the 1900s, the Silver Party was formed, bringing many Republicans and Democrats together from the western states. The party was so-named because of the federal government's shortage of silver coins in 1873. The Silver Party played a prominent role in Nevada's politics in the 1894 and 1898 elections. The Silver Party later formed the Silver Democratic Party. The Silver Democratic Party was prominent in Nevada until the election of 1906. After the election of 1906, the Democratic and Republican parties became the two primary parties in Nevada.

During the Great Depression of 1929, the two primary parties split many constitutional and federal offices. After the Great Depression, the citizens of Nevada preferred the Democratic Party over the Republican Party. Democrats were well received by Nevada and won most of the statewide and federal races from 1932 until 1995.

March 2021 DSA Takeover

In March 2021, The Intercept reported on a five-year intra-party conflict in the Nevada Democratic Party, waged between supporters of former Senate Majority Leader Harry Reid and members of the party's progressive wing since the 2016 Democratic presidential primaries. Following sweeping gains of leadership positions by progressive candidates backed by the local Democratic Socialists of America chapter on March 6, the entire Nevada Democratic Party staff resigned. On March 4, 2023, a "unity" slate of candidates were elected, ending the DSA takeover.

Platform and structure
The current platform for the party was ratified in 2020. The topics that are covered include the military, veterans, healthcare, civil rights, education, elections and government, voting rights, environment and energy, foreign policy, jobs and the economy, and working Nevadans.

A priority for Nevada Democrats in the 2010s and 2020s has been increasing the minimum wage. In 2019, Democratic governor Steve Sisolak signed a bill passed by a Democratic legislature to raise Nevada's minimum wage to $12 an hour.

The party has a formal set of by-laws that form the party structure. These by-laws contain nine articles with many sections in each article.

Executive Board
Chair: Daniele Monroe-Moreno
1st Vice-Chair: Daniel Corena
2nd Vice-Chair: Francisco Morales
Secretary: Travis Brock
Treasurer: Leilani Hinyard

National Committee Representatives
 National Committeeman: Alex Goff
 National Committeewoman: Allison Stephens

Current Democratic officeholders
The Nevada Democratic Party controls five of the state's six statewide offices, a majority in the Nevada Senate, and a majority in the Nevada Assembly. Democrats also hold both of the state's U.S. Senate seats and three of the state's four U.S. House of Representatives seats.

Members of Congress

U.S. Senate 
Democrats have controlled both of Nevada's seats in the U.S. Senate since 2018:

U.S. House of Representatives 
Out of the four seats Nevada is apportioned in the U.S. House of Representatives, three are held by Democrats:

Statewide offices 
Democrats control three of the six elected statewide offices:

Secretary of State: Cisco Aguilar

State legislature 
 Senate Majority Leader: Nicole Cannizzaro
 Senate President Pro Tempore: Mo Denis
 Assistant Senate Majority Leader: Joyce Woodhouse
 Senate Chief Majority Whip: Pat Spearman 
 Senate Co-Majority Whips: Chris Brooks and Marilyn Dondero-Loop
 Speaker of Nevada Assembly: Jason Frierson
 Speaker Pro Tempore of Nevada Assembly: Steve Yeager 
 Assembly Majority Floor Leader: Teresa Benitez-Thompson
 Assembly Assistant Majority Floor Leader: Daniele Monroe-Moreno
 Assembly Majority Whip: Edgar Flores
 Assembly Assistant Majority Whip: Sandra Jauregui

County chairs
 Carson City: Lewis Hardy
 Churchill County: Larry Jackson 
 Clark County: Chris Roberts
 Douglas County: Donna Weidner
 Elko County, Nevada: Steve Anderson
 Esmeralda County: Vacant
 Eureka County: Vacant
 Lander County: Claudio Cardoza
 Humboldt County: Vacant
 Lincoln County: Vacant
 Lyon County: Tony Stephenson 
 Mineral County: Béa Whitney
 Nye County: Kelly Fitzpatrick
 Pershing County: Vacant
 Storey County: Vacant
 Washoe County: Sarah Mahler
 White Pine County: Vacant

Election results

Presidential

Gubernatorial

References

External links
Nevada State Democratic Party

 
Democratic Party (United States) by state
Democratic